El Palmar Club de Fútbol-Estrella Grana is a Spanish football team based in El Palmar, in the Region of Murcia. Founded in 2006 it plays in Tercera División – Group 13, holding home games at Polideportivo El Palmar. 

On 30 June 2017, the club reached an agreement with CF Lorca Deportiva to become its reserve team, terminating the vinculation at the end of the season.

Season to season

7 seasons in Tercera División

References

External links
 
La Preferente team profile 
Soccerway team profile

Football clubs in the Region of Murcia
Association football clubs established in 2006
2006 establishments in Spain